Wild Jimbos is the 1991 album by Wild Jimbos. Wild Jimbos is Jim Salestrom, Jimmy Ibbotson and Jim Ratts. Salestrom was a member of Dolly Parton's band. Ibbotson was a member of the Nitty Gritty Dirt Band, as a songwriter, singer, and multi-instumentalist. Ratts is a member of Runaway Express.

The song, "Sarah in the Summer," was originally released as "Sara" on Ibbotson's first solo album Nitty Gritty Ibbotson in 1977. It was also recorded again as "Sarah in the Summer" by Ibbotson during his Nitty Gritty Dirt Band tenure, specifically on their 1994 album, Acoustic.

Track listing
All tracks composed by Jimmy Ibbotson; except where noted.
"Howlin' at the Moon" (Jim Ratts, John McEuen) - 3:09
"Sarah in the Summer" - 3:07
"Train in the Canyon" (Jimmy Ibbotson, Joe Henry) - 4:48
"Let's Talk Dirty in Hawaiian" (Fred Koller, John Prine) - 3:08
"Tilt a World" (Jim Ratts) - 2:49
"My New Wife" - 2:44
"Unconditional Love" (Jimmy Salestrom) - 3:25
"Bolongo Bay" - 3:57
"Where The Light Comes From" (Don Schlitz, Thom Schuyler) - 3:34
"You and Me Kid" - 3:05

Personnel
Jim Salestrom (Salebo) - Vocals, guitars, ukulele, bird calls
Jimmy Ibbotson (Ibbo)- Vocals, drums, guitar, bass
Jim Ratts (Rattbo) - Vocals, bass
with
Sam Bush (Sambo) - Fiddle, Mandolin, Background vocals, acoustic guitars, bass
Macebo - Hawaiian lap steel guitar (very Jimboish) on "Let's talk Dirty".

Production
Producer - in a Jimbo way by Sam Bush

References
All information from the album liner notes, unless otherwise noted.

1991 albums
MCA Records albums